The 1984 All-Big Eight Conference football team consists of American football players chosen by various organizations for All-Big Eight Conference teams for the 1984 NCAA Division I-A football season.  The selectors for the 1984 season included the Associated Press (AP).

Offensive selections

Quarterbacks
 Danny Bradley, Oklahoma (AP-1)

Running backs
 Jeff Smith, Nebraska (AP-1)
 Doug DuBose, Nebraska (AP-1)

Tight ends
 Jon Embree, Colorado (AP-1)

Wide receivers
 George Shorthose, Missouri (AP-1)

Centers
 Mark Traynowicz, Nebraska (AP-1)

Down linemen
 Harry Grimminger, Nebraska (AP-1)
 Mark Behning, Nebraska (AP-1)
 John Clay, Missouri (AP-1)
 Paul Blair, Oklahoma State (AP-1)

Defensive selections

Defensive ends
 Scott Strasburger, Nebraska (AP-1)
 Bill Weber, Nebraska (AP-1)

Nose guard
 Tony Casillas, Oklahoma (AP-1)

Defensive tackles
 Leslie O'Neal, Oklahoma State (AP-1)
 Rodney Harding, Oklahoma State (AP-1)

Linebackers
 Matt Manger, Oklahoma State (AP-1)
 Brian Bosworth, Oklahoma (AP-1)
 Willie Pless, Kansas (AP-1)

Defensive backs
 Barton Hundley, Kansas State (AP-1)
 Bret Clark, Nebraska (AP-1)
 Rod Brown, Oklahoma State (AP-1)

Special teams

Place-kicker
 Larry Roach, Oklahoma State (AP-1)

Punter
 Scott Livingston, Nebraska (AP-1)

Key

AP = Associated Press

See also
 1984 College Football All-America Team

References

All-Big Seven Conference football team
All-Big Eight Conference football teams